Wang Junguang (born December 25, 1994) is a Chinese kickboxer. He is the former Enfusion 57 kg World champion.

Combat Press ranked him in the super flyweight top ten between September 2020 and July 2021. From May 2019 to August 2020, he was ranked in the strawweight top ten by Combat Press.

Martial arts career
Junguang was scheduled to fight Akira Yoshida at Glory of Heroes 6. He won the fight by a second round KO.

In September 2017, Junguang was scheduled to fight for the K-1 Featherweight title against the incumbent titleholder Takeru Segawa. Takeru won the fight by a unanimous decision.

Wang was scheduled to fight Longoen Dabransarakarm at WLF 2019 First Group Stage. He won the fight by a unanimous decision.

Junguang captured the vacant Enfusion 57 kg title with a fourth round knockout of Jorge Varela during the WLF's 2019 Third Stage event.

He made his ONE Championship debut in October 2019, when he was scheduled to fight Federico Roma. He won the fight by a first round TKO.

Junguang fought Sam-A Gaiyanghadao for the inaugural ONE Strawweight Kickboxing title during ONE Championship: Mark Of Greatness. Sam-A won the fight by a unanimous decision.

Junguang is scheduled to fight Aslanbek Zikreev during ONE Championship: Inside the Matrix 4. He lost the fight by split decision.

Titles and accomplishments
 2019 Enfusion -57 kg Champion

Kickboxing record

|-  style="background:#fbb"
| 2022-12-03|| Loss||align=left| Taito Gunji ||  K-1 World GP 2022 in Osaka || Osaka, Japan || Decision (Majority)|| 3 || 3:00 

|-  style="background:#fbb"
| 2022-08-11|| Loss ||align=left| Toma ||  K-1 World GP 2022 in Fukuoka, Tournament Semifinals || Fukuoka, Japan || Decision (Unanimous) || 3 || 3:00
|-  style="background:#cfc"
| 2022-08-11|| Win ||align=left| Takahito Niimi ||  K-1 World GP 2022 in Fukuoka, Tournament Quarterfinals || Fukuoka, Japan || Decision (Unanimous)|| 3 ||3:00
|-
|-  style="background:#cfc;"
| 2022-03-26 || Win || align=left| Qumu Xifu || Wu Lin Feng 528 || Zhengzhou, China || Decision (Unanimous)|| 3||3:00

|-  style="background:#cfc;"
| 2021-10-30 || Win || align=left| Liu Zhipeng	 || Wu Lin Feng 2021: WLF on Haihua Island || Daizhou, China || Decision (Unanimous) ||3  ||3:00

|-  style="background:#fbb;"
| 2020-11-20 || Loss ||align=left| Aslanbek Zikreev || ONE Championship: Inside the Matrix 4 || Kallang, Singapore || Decision (Split) || 3 ||3:00
|-  style="background:#FFBBBB;"
| 2019-12-09||Loss ||align=left| Sam-A Gaiyanghadao ||  |ONE Championship: Mark Of Greatness || Kuala Lumpur, Malaysia || Decision (Unanimous)  || 5 || 3:00 
|-
! style=background:white colspan=9 |
|-  style="background:#cfc;"
| 2019-10-26|| Win ||align=left| Federico Roma ||  |ONE Championship: Dawn Of Valor || Jakarta, Indonesia || TKO (3 Knockdowns/Punches) || 1 || 2:57
|-  style="background:#cfc;"
| 2019-08-31|| Win ||align=left| Jorge Varela || Wu Lin Feng 2019: WLF -67kg World Cup 2019-2020 3rd Group Stage || Zhengzhou, China || KO (Spinning back kick to the body) || 4 || 0:55  
|-
! style=background:white colspan=9 |
|-  style="background:#cfc;"
| 2019-06-29|| Win ||align=left| Longoen Dabransarakarm || Wu Lin Feng 2019: WLF -67kg World Cup 2019-2020 1st Group Stage || Zhengzhou, China || Decision (Unanimous) || 3 || 3:00
|-  style="background:#CCFFCC;"
| 2018-09-15|| Win ||align=left| Khavazh Oligov || Glory of Heroes 34: Tongling || Anhui, China || Decision (Unanimous) || 3 || 3:00
|-  style="background:#CCFFCC;"
| 2018-07-28|| Win ||align=left| Tenma Sano || Glory of Heroes 33: Shanghai || Shanghai, China || Decision (Unanimous) || 3 || 3:00
|-  style="background:#CCFFCC;"
| 2018-05-26|| Win ||align=left| Yevgen Kraminskyi|| Glory of Heroes 31: Beijing || Beijing, China || Decision (Unanimous) || 3 || 3:00
|-  style="background:#CCFFCC;"
| 2018-03-03|| Win ||align=left| Dominic Reed || Glory of Heroes: New Zealand vs China || Auckland, New Zealand || Decision (Unanimous) || 3 || 3:00
|-  style="background:#FFBBBB;"
| 2017-12-23|| Loss||align=left| Astemir Borsov || Glory of Heroes: Jinan, 57 kg Tournament Semi-Finals || Jinan, China || Decision (Unanimous) || 3 || 3:00
|-  bgcolor="#FFBBBB"
| 2017-09-18|| Loss|| align=left| Takeru ||K-1 World GP 2017 Welterweight Championship Tournament || Tokyo, Japan || Decision (Unanimous) || 3 || 3:00
|-
! style=background:white colspan=9 |
|-  style="background:#CCFFCC;"
| 2017-07-16|| Win||align=left| Satomi Yuzuki ||Glory of Heroes: Japan & Krush.77  || Tokyo, Japan || Decision (Majority) || 3 || 3:00
|-  style="background:#CCFFCC;"
| 2017-05-27|| Win||align=left| Bernardo Mendes || Glory of Heroes: Portugal & Strikers League || Carcavelos, Portugal || Decision || 3 || 3:00
|-  style="background:#CCFFCC;"
| 2017-03-25|| Win||align=left| Shaxi || Rise of Heroes: Hengyang || Hengyang, China || Decision (Unanimous) || 3 || 3:00
|-  style="background:#CCFFCC;"
| 2017-01-13|| Win||align=left| Akira Yoshida || Glory of Heroes 6 || Jiyuan, China || KO (Punches) || 2 ||
|- style="background:#cfc;"
| 2016-10-14 || Win ||align=left| Phetkriangkrai Tor Silachai|| Wu Lin Feng x KF1 || Hong Kong || Decision || 3 || 3:00
|-  style="background:#CCFFCC;"
| 2016-09-17|| Win||align=left| Feng Tianhao || Rise of Heroes 1, 57kg Tournament Final || Chaoyang, China || Decision (Unanimous) || 3 || 3:00
|-  style="background:#CCFFCC;"
| 2016-09-17|| Win||align=left| Thanapon || Rise of Heroes 1, 57kg Tournament Semifinals || Jiyuan, Chaoyang || TKO  || 2 ||
|-  style="background:#CCFFCC;"
| 2016-08-06|| Win||align=left| Sankeng|| Glory of Heroes 4 || Changzhi, Chaoyang || Decision (Unanimous) || 3 || 3:00
|-  style="background:#FFBBBB;"
| 2016-06-17|| Loss ||align=left| Hakim Hamech || Wu Lin Feng || China || Decision || 3 || 3:00
|-  style="background:#CCFFCC;"
| 2016-06-04|| Win ||align=left| Masafumi Kurasaki || Wu Lin Feng vs Krush || China || KO (3 knockdowns) || 1 ||
|-  style="background:#CCFFCC;"
| 2016-03-05|| Win ||align=left| Sufenni Haji  || Wu Lin Feng || China || Decision || 3 || 3:00
|-  style="background:#CCFFCC;"
| 2015-11-07|| Win ||align=left| Sirik Urazov  || Wu Lin Feng || China || ||  ||
|-  style="background:#c5d2ea;"
| 2015-04-12|| Draw ||align=left| Bazooka Koki || Wu Lin Feng x FG - China vs Japan || Tokyo, Japan || Decision (Majority) || 3 || 3:00

|-  style="background:#CCFFCC;"
| 2015-01-17|| Win ||align=left| Bo Min  || Wu Lin Feng || China || Decision|| 3 || 3:00
|-  style="background:#CCFFCC;"
| 2014-01-03|| Win||align=left| Petchklangnam Sor Visetkij|| Hero Legends || Shandong, China || Decision || 3 || 3:00
|-
| colspan=9 | Legend:

See also
 List of male kickboxers

References

1994 births
Living people
Chinese male kickboxers
Chinese Muay Thai practitioners
ONE Championship kickboxers
Sportspeople from Henan
People from Shangqiu